4-Caffeoyl-1,5-quinide (4-caffeoylquinic-1,5-lactone or 4-CQL) is found in roasted coffee beans. It is formed by lactonization of 4-O-caffeoylquinic acid during the roasting process.

It is reported to possess opioid antagonist properties in mice.

References

Lactones
Coffee chemistry
Mu-opioid receptor antagonists
Hydroxycinnamic acid esters
Vinylogous carboxylic acids
Heterocyclic compounds with 2 rings